Kʼakʼupakal, or possibly Kʼakʼupakal Kʼawiil (fl. c. 869–890) was a ruler or high-ranking officeholder at the pre-Columbian Maya site of Chichen Itza, during the latter half of the 9th century CE. The name of this ruler, alternatively written Kʼahkʼupakal, Kʼakʼ Upakal or Kʼakʼ-u-pakal, is the most widely mentioned personal name in the surviving Maya inscriptions at Chichen Itza, and also appears on monumental inscriptions at other Yucatán Peninsula sites such as Uxmal.

Notes

References
 
 

Chichen Itza
Maya rulers
Year of birth uncertain